Nancy Voorhees (January 4, 1906 – June 1988) was an American high jumper. She won a gold medal at the 1922 Women's World Games, setting the first world record at 1.46 m. Her elder sister Louise competed alongside in the high jump at those Games. Nancy married C. Redington Barrett in 1930.

References

1906 births
1988 deaths
American female high jumpers
20th-century American women